The Voinești is a right tributary of the river Bahlui in Romania. It discharges into the Bahlui in Lețcani. Lake Cucuteni is located on the Voinești.

References

Rivers of Romania
Rivers of Iași County